The Terms of Withdrawal from EU (Referendum) Bills were a series of private member's bills of the Parliament of the United Kingdom to make provision for the holding of a second referendum in the United Kingdom and Gibraltar on whether or not to leave the European Union either before Article 50 of the Lisbon Treaty can be triggered or following the conclusion of negotiations by the Welsh Labour MP Geraint Davies. The first version of this bill was presented in the 2016–2017 session of Parliament to the House of Commons and received its first reading on 6 July 2016 but lapsed when Parliament was dissolved. The Government triggered Article 50 at the end of March 2017.

A second version this bill was presented in the 2017–2019 session of Parliament, after Article 50 was triggered. The bill with its proposal to hold a referendum on the negotiated terms of withdrawal from the EU remains in the UK parliament and was first introduced to the House of Commons and  received its first reading 6 September 2017 and its due to have its second reading on 6 July 2018.

Origin
On 23 June 2016 the United Kingdom and Gibraltar voted by 51.9% to 48.1% to Leave the European Union in the 2016 EU membership referendum. The result saw contrasting views throughout the country with Greater London, Northern Ireland and Scotland strongly voting to remain whilst all the other English regions and Wales voted to leave.

The original 2016-17 bill sought to hold the proposed referendum before Article 50 could be formally triggered by HM Government however the bill failed to pass before the United Kingdom triggered Article 50 on 29 March 2017 and the snap general election which was held on 8 June 2017. This led to a second version of the bill which proposes to hold the referendum following the conclusion of negotiations between the Government and the European Union.

Bills proposed referendum question

The bills give the proposed question to appear on ballot papers:

with the responses to the question to be (to be marked with a single (X)):

The Bills also order the question to be printed in Welsh.

See also
 2016 United Kingdom European Union membership referendum
 European Union Referendum Act 2015
 European Union (Notification of Withdrawal) Act 2017
 United Kingdom invocation of Article 50
 Opposition to Brexit in the United Kingdom
 European Union Withdrawal Agreement (Public Vote) Bill 2017-19

References

Consequences of the 2016 United Kingdom European Union membership referendum
United Kingdom and the European Union
Referendums in the United Kingdom
Proposed laws of the United Kingdom
2016 in British politics
2017 in British politics
Brexit